FSQ may refer to 

A number of computers ("Army Navy / Fixed Special eQuipment") manufactured by IBM:
AN/FSQ-7
AN/FSQ-8
AN/FSQ-31V
AN/FSQ-32

It may also refer to:
Football Stewarding Qualification
Fry Street Quartet
Free Sale Quota, a term connected to coffee production in India
Fast Simple QSO - digital mode used in Amateur Radio